The Dep is a left tributary of the Zeya (itself a tributary of the Amur) in Amur Oblast, eastern Russia.

See also
List of rivers of Russia

References

Rivers of Amur Oblast